The innermost stable circular orbit (often called the ISCO) is the smallest marginally stable circular orbit in which a test particle can stably orbit a massive object in general relativity. The location of the ISCO, the ISCO-radius, depends on the mass and angular momentum (spin) of the central object. The ISCO plays an important role in black hole accretion disks since it marks the inner edge of the disk.

The ISCO should not be confused with the Roche limit, the innermost point where a physical object can orbit before tidal forces break it up. The ISCO is concerned with theoretical test particles, not real objects. In general terms, the ISCO will be far closer to the central object than the Roche limit.

Basic concept
In classical mechanics, an orbit is achieved when a test particle's angular momentum is enough to resist the gravity force of the central object. As the test particle approaches the central object, the required amount of angular momentum grows, due to the inverse square law nature of gravitation. Orbits can be achieved at any altitude, as there is no upper limit to velocity in classical mechanics.

In general relativity (GR) things become more complex. For one, there is now an upper limit to the speed of any object, the speed of light. If one considers lowering a test particle in orbit toward a central object in GR, one will eventually reach a point where the required speed is greater than light. This defines the innermost possible instantaneous orbit, known as the innermost circular orbit, which lies at 1.5 times Schwarzschild radius (for a Black Hole governed by the Schwarzschild metric). This distance is also known as the photon sphere.

In GR, gravity is not simply a central force that pulls on objects, it works by changing spacetime and thus the path the test particle travels. The ISCO arises because of these additional terms, in particular, a new attractive term that is part of the equation of energy of a test particle near the central object. This term cannot be offset by additional angular momentum, and any particle within this radius will spiral into the center. The precise nature of the term depends on the conditions of the central object and its rotation.

Non-rotating black holes
For a non-spinning massive object, where the gravitational field can be expressed with the Schwarzschild metric, the ISCO is located at

where  is the Schwarzschild radius of the massive object with mass . Thus, even for a non-spinning object, the ISCO radius is only three times the Schwarzschild radius, suggesting that only black holes and neutron stars have innermost stable circular orbits outside of their surfaces. As the angular momentum of the central object increases,  decreases.

Bound circular orbits are still possible between the ISCO and the so-called marginally bound orbit, which has a radius of

but they are unstable. Between  and the photon sphere so-called unbound orbits are possible which are extremely unstable and which afford a total energy of more than the rest mass at infinity.

For a massless test particle like a photon, the only possible but unstable circular orbit is exactly at the photon sphere. Inside the photon sphere, no circular orbits exist. Its radius is

The lack of stability inside the ISCO is explained by the fact that lowering the orbit does not free enough potential energy for the orbital speed necessary: the acceleration gained is too little. This is usually shown by a graph of the orbital effective potential which is lowest at the ISCO.

Rotating black holes
The case for rotating black holes is somewhat more complicated. The equatorial ISCO in the Kerr metric depends on whether the orbit is prograde (negative sign in ) or retrograde (positive sign in ):

where

with the rotation parameter .

The retrograde radii hence increase towards 
 
,
.

If the particle is also spinning there is a further split in ISCO radius depending on whether the spin is aligned with or against the black hole rotation.

References

External links
 Leo C. Stein, Kerr calculator V2 

General relativity
Black holes
Orbits